Madison Gillham Gonterman (February 8, 1871 – September 30, 1941) was an American football player, coach, college athletics administrator, and lawyer.  He served as the head football coach at Indiana University from 1896 to 1897 and at Knox College in Galesburg, Illinois in 1899, compiling a career college football coaching record of 16–8–2. Replacing Edgar Syrett, Gonterman was also Indiana University's second athletic director from 1897 to 1898. He was succeeded by James H. Horne in 1898.  Gonterman graduated from Harvard Law School in 1899. He later acted as counsel in Massachusetts for the United States Railroad Administration.

Head coaching record

References

1871 births
1941 deaths
19th-century players of American football
American football halfbacks
Harvard Crimson football players
Indiana Hoosiers athletic directors
Indiana Hoosiers football coaches
Knox Prairie Fire football coaches
Harvard Law School alumni
Massachusetts lawyers
People from Princeton, Illinois
Players of American football from Illinois